Love Prevails is the third studio album by Abandon. 2TEN Records released the album on November 4, 2014.

Critical reception

Awarding the album four stars at CCM Magazine, Andy Argyrakis states, "a cutting edge collection". Amanda Furbeck, giving the album four stars from Worship Leader, writes, "put a retro-yet-fresh spin on their musical style". Rating the album three and a half stars by Jesus Freak Hideout, Bert Gangl describes, "Love Prevails doesn't quite ascend to the same rocking, quirky, funk-filled heights as its predecessor...it comes across as both a moral and stylistic victory for its talented and tenacious creators." Christopher Smith, awarding the album three stars for Jesus Freak Hideout, writes, "Love Prevails doesn't do much to stand out." Giving the album three and a half stars from 365 Days of Inspiring Media, Jonathan Andre says, "Love Prevails is just the album for us to fall in love with Justin’s powerful voice as much as his brother Josh’s when he was around leading the band. " Laura Chambers, rating the album a 3.8 out of five review for Christian Music Review, states, "A solid, consistent message throughout, catchy hooks, and honesty make this album a decent buy".

Track listing

References

2014 albums
Abandon (band) albums